Most sovereign states have alternative names. Some countries have also undergone name changes for political or other reasons. This article attempts to give all known alternative names and initialisms for all nations, countries, and sovereign states, in English and any predominant or official languages of the country in question.

Countries are listed alphabetically by their description, the most common name or term that is politically neutral and unambiguous. This may be followed by a note as to the status of the description used.

a = (common, English)

A

B

C

D

E

F

G

H

I

J

K

L

M

N

O

P

Q

R

S

T

U

V

W

Y

Z

See also
List of country names in various languages
List of countries and capitals in native languages
List of countries

References

Alternative country names
Alternative

pt:Anexo:Lista de grafias alternativas para topónimos relativos a países